Hillsboro Municipal Airport  is three miles south of Hillsboro, in Traill County, North Dakota,. It is owned by the Hillsboro Municipal Airport Authority. The FAA's National Plan of Integrated Airport Systems for 2011–2015 categorized it as a general aviation facility.

Facilities
The airport covers 55 acres (22 ha) at an elevation of 906 feet (276 m). Its single runway, 16/34, is 3,301 by 60 feet (1,006 x 18 m).

In the year ending September 30, 2010 the airport had 14,670 aircraft operations, average 40 per day: 98% general aviation, 2% air taxi, and <1% military.  22 single-engine aircraft were then based at this airport.

Accolades 
In 2022, the North Dakota Aeronautics Commission and the Airport Association of North Dakota named Hillsboro Municipal Airport the General Aviation Airport of the Year, the fourth time it has received that award.

References

External links 
 Hillsboro Municipal Airport at North Dakota Aeronautics Commission airport directory
 Aerial image as of September 1997 from USGS The National Map
 

Airports in North Dakota
Buildings and structures in Traill County, North Dakota
Transportation in Traill County, North Dakota